Autheuil-Authouillet is a commune in the Eure department in Normandy in northern France. It was the home of Simone Signoret and Yves Montand, after whom the village's main street, rue Yves Montand, is named.

Population

See also
Communes of the Eure department

References

Communes of Eure